The SAFF Women's Championship, also called the South Asian Football Federation Women's Cup, is a competition for women's national football teams governed by the South Asian Football Federation (SAFF). All seven members are eligible to participate in the tournament.

History
The current SAFF members are Bangladesh, Bhutan, India, Maldives, Nepal, Pakistan and Sri Lanka. Formerly, eight members used to compete, prior to the departure of Afghanistan from SAFF. It is held every two years.

India won first 5 edition so far, beating Nepal four times and Bangladesh once in the final. Bangladesh is the current champion having defeated Nepal by 3–1 goals on 19 September 2022 in the final.

Results

Statistics

Performance by nation

Bold = Hosts
* = Not part of SAFF anymore

Participating nations
Legend

 – Champions
 – Runners-up
 – Third place
 – Fourth place
 – Semifinals
GS – Group stage
dq – Disqualified/Suspended by FIFA/AFC/SAFF.
q – Qualified for upcoming tournament
 — Hosts
 ×  – Did not enter
 ×  – Withdrew before tournament begins
 — Not part of SAFF

All-time table
As of 2022

Winning coaches

Awards
The following awards were given at the conclusion of the tournament. The Most Valuable Player (best overall player), Top scorers (top scorer) and Best Goalkeeper (goalkeeper with the most clean sheets) awards were given to the player and, the Fair play award were given to the Team.

See also
 SAFF Championship
 AFC Women's Asian Cup
 AFF Women's Championship
 CAFA Women's Championship
 EAFF E-1 Women's Football Championship
 WAFF Women's Championship
 Sub-continental football championships in Asia
 SABA Women's Championship
 South Asian Games

References

External links
South Asian Football Federation official website
Tournament at soccerway.com
South Asia Football - Complete SAFF website (old)

SAFF Women's Championship
Women's international association football competitions
Women's association football competitions in Asia
SAFF competitions
Recurring sporting events established in 2010
2010 establishments in Asia